Vis is a Dutch metonymic occupational surname. Vis means "fish" and referred to a fisherman. Variant forms are De Vis ("the fish"), De Visch,  and Visch.

People with this surname include:
 Caroline Vis (born 1970), Dutch tennis player
 Fiderd Vis (born 1981), Aruban judoka
  (born 1940), Dutch novelist
 Jan Vis (1933–2011), Dutch journalist, legal scholar, and politician
 Judith Vis (born 1980), Dutch hurdler and heptathlete
  (born 1947), Dutch conductor and composer
 Marja Vis (born 1977), Dutch speed skater
 Rudi Vis (1941–2010), Dutch-born British politician and MP
 Russell Vis (1900–1990), American wrestler
 Willem Cornelis Vis (1924–1993), Dutch jurist and expert in international commercial transactions
De Vis
Charles Walter De Vis (1829–1915), English zoologist and botanist active in Australia
(De) Visch
Charles de Visch (1596–1666), Flemish abbot and bibliographer
 (born 1950), Dutch sculptor
Matthias de Visch (1701–1765), Flemish historical and portrait painter
Soraya de Visch Eijbergen (born 1993), Dutch badminton player

References

Dutch-language surnames
Occupational surnames